A pre-game, pregame, or pre-match show is a television or radio presentation that occurs immediately before the live broadcast of a major sporting event. They typically feature previews and analysis relating to upcoming games (either a larger fixture, or a single game), including panel discussions, reports filed from the sites of the day's game, interviews with players and other personnel (such as coaches), and other feature segments.

The networks that broadcast the NFL were the first networks to create and air pre-game shows. CBS was the first to broadcast a sports pre-game show in 1964, when the network launched a 15-minute regional sports program that interviewed players and coaches and featured news and features about the league. The show aired immediately before games on CBS. The show originated in studio and live from the fields, and featured broadcaster Jack Buck. In 1967, the show grew to 30 minutes in length and in 1976, aired a new 90-minute “Super Bowl Special” before Super Bowl X. The show moved to two hours long in 1984 and featured 11 broadcasters, 13 producers and four directors.

FOX created its own pre-game show when it won the rights to broadcast NFC games in 1994. The network hired James Brown to host the show, Fox NFL Sunday, and brought on analysts such as Terry Bradshaw to lead the coverage.  In 2006, Brown left the network to return to CBS and host their pre-game show, The NFL Today.

NBC launched its own version of a pre-game show – Grandstand – in 1975, and not only featured NFL programming, but other sporting events around the nation. The show led up to the NFL's 1 p.m. games but covered college football, golf, tennis and many other sports and topics. The network hired Jack Buck to host the show and the show didn't just preview that day's NFL games but did investigative pieces on a variety of topics.

Pre-game shows generally run for 30 minutes to one hour, though on special occasions (such as championship games), it is not uncommon to air longer pre-game shows (with the Super Bowl now typically airing one across the entire afternoon prior to its evening kickoff).

While most pre-game shows are done in a studio, some shows may broadcast from the site of a particular game, usually for marquee events or championship games. ESPN's College GameDay franchise (which it broadcasts for college football and basketball) regularly broadcasts live from the campuses of schools hosting the day's biggest game (or in some cases, a game that the network wishes to highlight) and—most frequently on its football version—is often attended by an audience of fans that serve as a backdrop to the studio panel.

See also
 Halftime show
 Post-game show
 List of AFL Grand Final pre-match performances

References

Terminology used in multiple sports